The Manx Grand Prix motorcycle races are held on the Isle of Man TT Course (or 'Mountain Circuit') every year for a two-week period, usually spanning the end of August and early September. New for 2022 is a period reduction from 14 to 9 days.

The MGP or Manx (as it is more commonly known) is considered to be the amateur rider's alternative and a learning experience for the Isle of Man TT races held in May/June. The event differs from the TT in that it does not cater for sidecars. A 'Classic TT' race category for historic racing machines was added in 2013 as part of the Manx Government Department of Economic Development's expansion to create what is termed Festival of Motorcycling. These new races also allowed for professional and experienced riders to compete.

The event consists of six four-lap races of the  circuit which begins at the TT Grandstand in Douglas, the island's capital. The separate classes are the Newcomers Class, Lightweight/Ultra Lightweight Class, Junior Class, Senior Class and the Junior/Lightweight and Senior Classic races for older machines ('Classics').

History
The MGP began in 1923 as the 'Manx Amateur Road Races' or MARC. The MARC continued until 1930 when renamed as the Manx Grand Prix. Problems were encountered initially over the definition of an 'Amateur' and the first rules were extensive and open to various interpretations. Nowadays, many riders who have achieved success in the MGP move on to race in the TT but regulations prevent them from re-entering 'The Manx' unless they wish to do so on Classic machinery. Chris Palmer (former British 125cc champion) and the late Richard Britton both followed this route in 2005 aboard Manx Nortons.

In 1989 Gloria Clark became the first woman to race in the MGP. In 1991 she gained an entry into the Guinness Book Of Records for being the fastest lady on the TT Circuit. Carolynn Sells was entered into the Guinness World Records as the first female winner on the Snaefell Mountain Course of the Ultra-Lightweight event at the 2009 Manx Grand Prix.

The MGP is organised by the Manx Motor Cycle Club (MMCC) based on the rules and regulations of the Auto-Cycle Union (ACU) which governs most British motorcycle events.

Classes
The Newcomers class caters for riders who have no previous experience of the Mountain Circuit. Such a class does not feature in the programme of the TT and is thus the only opportunity for newcomers to race the circuit in competition. Classes are usually over-subscribed as a result. Riders are limited to machinery with a capacity not exceeding 750cc and must wear coloured bibs over their leathers during 'Practice' (see below). Newcomers are also permitted to submit an application for any of the other classes but may or may not be granted a ride depending on their levels of experience.

The Lightweight/Ultra Lightweight class is represented by machinery of 125cc, 250cc and 400cc capacity. This class featured at the TT until 2004 but is now defunct and so, like the Newcomers' class, is extremely popular. 'Lightweight' refers to the 250cc 2-stroke machines whilst Ultra-Lightweight is the 125 2-strokes and 400cc 4-stroke bikes. This class is run as two separate races on Race Days (see below) but all the machines leave the start line in the same 'Session' (see below)The Manx Grand Prix Ultra Lightweight class lap record is still held  by a Yamaha fzr 400. 109.86.mph Still held by Keith Taylor. This was before tuned mini twins were made eligible.

The Junior Class features machines whose capacity must not exceed 750cc. Machines of any engine capacity between 200 and 750cc are permitted but the vast majority of entrants opt to race four-stroke 4-cylinder 600cc bikes. Some 2-stroke 250cc machines are entered and there is a separate award for the highest-placed 2-stroke finisher (see 'Awards' below.)

The Senior Class is the final race of MGP fortnight and allows for motorcycles with an engine capacity not exceeding 1000cc. Again 600cc bikes are more popular than any other but a number of 750s are sprinkled in the start list.

The Senior Classic race features the most diverse range of marques and is very popular, with a full quota of 105 entrants accepted in 2005. Entrants must field a machine with an engine capacity between 350 and 500cc. Most riders choose machines with a capacity of between 450 and 500cc and common marques include Norton, Honda, Seeley and Matchless with the odd BSA and Ducati.

The Junior/Lightweight Classic is open to machines of 350cc capacity or lower. Run as separate races for machines between 250-350cc (Junior) and under 250cc (Lightweight) all bikes are on-circuit at the same time during the race, but are released at separate class intervals. (This procedure also applies to the Lightweight/Ultra Lightweight.)

In 2008 the Manx Motor Cycle Club recognised the emergence of Post Classic racing These machines manufactured in the 1980s have also had a history of being raced on the Isle of Man TT course. The 2009 Post Classic Race was introduced with regulations designed to test machine availability. They stated "it has been agreed to keep these regulations as flexible as possible, but they may be subject to change in 2010".

Whilst being encouraged by the interest in the 2009 Post Classic Race the number of four stroke entries were fewer than expected. The reasons were perceived to be certain restrictions, and the cut off date of 1981.

The Formula Classic race is to allow 750cc pre-1973 Classic four stroke machines (now 850cc pre 1974 as for the 2011 meeting) to compete alongside the 500cc "Senior Classic" machines.
The Senior Post Classic: for 601 to 1050cc four stroke machines and 351 to 750cc two stroke machines, cut off date 31 December 1985.
The Junior Post Classic: four stroke machines up to 600cc, cut off date 31 December 1985 and two stroke machines up to 350cc, Grand Prix Factory Bikes Steel frame or period aluminium frame, any brakes, any wheels, cut off date 31 December 1984. Standard frames, Standard fairing, any ignition, no airboxes. Any brakes. Cut off dates 1 January 1985 – 31 December 1991.

Both the Senior Post Classic and Junior Post Classic are being run concurrently meaning one race with 2 separate classes.

By 2011, the Senior Post Classic was renamed as the Classic Superbike race or "Polo Class" and the introduction of a Twin Cylinder (Super Twin) MGP Race incorporating 650cc four stroke and 250cc two stroke machines and the reworking of the Lightweight MGP Race, limiting the race to 400cc four stroke, 125cc two stroke and the exciting new 450cc single cylinder machines.

As mentioned previously, newcomers must wear a coloured bib (usually orange or yellow) during practice sessions to distinguish themselves to other riders. Similarly, classic riders are obliged to wear white bibs. This does not apply during races as all the riders are obviously in the same class.

Format of the races

The first week of MGP fortnight is devoted to 'Practice.' Riders are given the opportunity to familiarise themselves with the course and must complete a minimum number of laps at a satisfactory speed in order to qualify for the races held in week 2.

Practising always begins on a Saturday evening (19 August in 2006) and is held the following Monday, Tuesday, Wednesday, Thursday, Friday and Saturday. Marshals around the course 'Close the Roads' at 6pm and practising begins at 6.15pm, with roads re-opening to the public at around 8.15pm. Practice is split into two 'groups' – 'All classes except Classic and Ultra Lightweight' and 'Classic and Ultra Lightweight only.' Session times are 6.15pm to 7.10pm and 7.15pm to 8.10pm and throughout the course of the week these groups interchange between the sessions, so for example Classic/Ultra L'Weight may start at 6.15 on Monday and 7.15 on Tuesday.

On the first evening of Practice, Newcomers are escorted around the course on a speed-controlled lap by the Traveling Marshals (8 marshals on bikes who lap the course regularly to check for problems.) They are then at liberty to circulate at their desired pace.

Racing then begins 2 days later on the Monday (28 August in 2006.) Practices are NEVER held on Sundays but continue into 'Race Week' for some of the later classes in the 'Race Programme' (see immediately below.)

The Race Programme is identical every year, with two races held on Monday, Wednesday and Friday of Race Week to make up the six classes.

Saturday: Newcomers Race Class A & Class B 17.30pm 3 Laps 113.00 miles

Monday: 350cc/250cc Classic Grand Prix 10.15am and Junior 1.15pm

Wednesday: 500cc Classic Grand Prix/Formula Classic Race 10.15am and Supertwin/Lightweight 1.15pm

Friday: Senior Manx Grand Prix 10.15am and Classic Superbike/Junior Post Classic Superbike 1.15pm

In the event of bad weather races can be delayed for later on the same days or even rescheduled for Tuesday or Thursday. In the past racing has extended beyond Friday and race distances can also be reduced by the organisers.

Famous MGP names
The Manx Grand Prix has been the stepping stone for many great riders who have gone on to become internationally famous. The likes of Martin Finnegan, Davy Morgan, Ray Porter and Kenneth McCrea are now well-established TT stars who also compete in road racing events elsewhere in the British Isles, especially the Irish road racing circuit.

Other famous names from bygone decades include Freddie Frith, Phil Read and the great Geoff Duke   and the great Mike Casey winner of 1995, all of whom raced at the TT –  Duke and Read went on to become multiple world champions.

'King of the Mountain' Joey Dunlop, the most successful TT rider of all time with 26 victories, also tried his hand at the MGP on a Classic Aermacchi and achieved a podium finish.

Awards

Various awards are given at the MGP each year. The Manx Motorcycle Club relies exclusively on entry fees and donations to fund the awards. Many trophies and cups have been donated in the past and range from 'Fastest Lap of the meeting' to "Most meritorious performance by a newcomer."

The winner of the Junior Manx Grand Prix receives the Douglas Pirie Trophy whilst the victor of the Senior Manx Grand Prix is awarded the A.B. Crookall Trophy. Convention however dictates that the A.B. Crookall Trophy can only be won once, as the winner of the Senior Manx Grand Prix is then obliged to enter the TT Races.

All riders completing a race receive a Finisher's Medal, and any who finish a race within a certain percentage of the winner's overall time are given a 'Replica.' Replicas are awarded to those finishing within 110% of the winners time. Team awards are also raced for although they are not always awarded every year. Such awards are not only aimed at riders competing for the same sponsor but also riders from the same motorcycle club. In total there are about 42 separate awards and the list will doubtless continue to grow.

Other MGP fortnight events
The MGP is popular with many motorcycle fans and is viewed as having a more relaxed atmosphere to that of the TT. Throughout the duration of the races there are various club meetings (particularly of classic machines) and there is also a Classic Parade on closed roads. Unlike the TT there is no funfair on Douglas Promenade but various entertainments include visiting and local music acts and the Manx 3-day Trial.

Total overall Manx Grand Prix race winners (including Manx Amateur Road Race winners)

Current Manx Grand Prix lap records

Awards

Race winner trophies

Sources

External links
Official Website
Information from Isle of Man Guide
Vintage Motorcycle Club Manx Grand Prix Rally

See also
Isle of Man TT
North West 200
Ulster Grand Prix

 
Snaefell Mountain Course
Recurring sporting events established in 1923
1923 establishments in the United Kingdom